Loafer is a 1973 Bollywood film directed by A. Bhimsingh. The film stars Dharmendra, Mumtaz in lead roles, with Om Prakash, Premnath, K. N. Singh in another important roles. The music for the film was composed by Laxmikant-Pyarelal.

The film was a "Hit" at the box office and ranked 7th in top grossers on 1973. With the films like Jugnu, Yaadon Ki Baaraat, Jheel Ke Us Paar, Kahani Kismat Ki, Keemat and Blackmail, Loafer became the 7th hit for Dharmendra in 1973 and thus removing Rajesh Khanna from the top spot. Dharmendra and Mumtaz were appreciated by the critics for their performance. The evergreen song "Aaj Mausam bada beiman hai" became a chart buster and was used in the 2001 film Monsoon Wedding

Plot
Ranjeet is a shiftless loafer and pickpocket working for a gang. He falls in love with Anju, but does not know she is spying on him for the leader of a rival gang. The gang leader tries to set a trap for Ranjeet, but Anju warns him and he escapes. Ranjeet also tries to help his friend, an apple vendor, pretend to be rich because he has lied to his daughter and said that he is a wealthy businessman. Meanwhile, Ranjeet must steal some jewels before the other gang steals them first. With the aid of a walking dog toy he tries to steal the jewels and Anju tells the gang leader that she will no longer spy on Ranjeet since she has fallen in love with him too.

Cast
Dharmendra as Ranjeet 
Mumtaz as Anju 
K. N. Singh as Mr. Singh 
Premnath as Pratap
Om Prakash as Gopinath
Farida Jalal as Roopa
Madan Puri as Mr. Puri
Anwar Hussain as Mr. Sinha
Manmohan as Singh's Agent
Hiralal as Singh's Agent
Ramayan Tiwari as Singh's Agent
Bhushan Tiwari as Pratap's Man
Iftekhar as Police Commissioner 
Mukri as Ranjeet's Man
Raj Mehra as Rajendranath Mehra
Anil Dhawan as Anil Mehra
Shaukat Kaifi as Anju's Mother
Randhir as Money Lender
Keshto Mukherjee as Drunk
Roopesh Kumar as Rakesh
Padma Khanna as Dancer

Music
Laxmikant-Pyarelal has composed the music and Anand Bakshi has penned the lyrics.

References

External links 
 

1970s Hindi-language films
1973 films
Films directed by A. Bhimsingh
Films scored by Laxmikant–Pyarelal